Pete Kremen is an American politician of the Democratic Party. He served for 12 years as a member of the Washington House of Representatives, representing the 42nd district, then served for 16 years as the Whatcom County Executive, the county's highest elected official, and the longest tenure for any county executive in state history. He finished his career with one term as a member of the Whatcom County Council before retiring in 2015. Before his political career, Kremen was the Director of News & Public Affairs at radio station KPUG.

References

Year of birth unknown
Living people
Place of birth missing (living people)
20th-century American politicians
21st-century American politicians
Whatcom County Councillors
Year of birth missing (living people)
Democratic Party members of the Washington House of Representatives
Washington (state) city council members